Olukorede Afolabi O. O. "Korede" Aiyegbusi (born 15 July 1988 in London) is an English footballer who plays for Swiss FC Amical Saint-Prex.

Career

College and amateur
Aiyegbusi moved from England to the United States in 2006 to attend and play college soccer at the Community College of Baltimore County Essex in Maryland, where he was a two-time National Junior College Athletic Association All-American and All-Maryland JUCO Conference first-team. He transferred to North Carolina State University in 2008, and went on to make 41 appearances for the Wolfpack, all of them starts.

During his college years Aiyegbusi also played for Cary Clarets in the USL Premier Development League.

Professional
Aiyegbusi was drafted in the second round (20th overall) of the 2010 MLS SuperDraft by Kansas City Wizards.

He made his professional debut on 27 March 2010, in Kansas City's opening game of the 2010 MLS season against D.C. United.

Aiyegbusi remained with Kansas City through the 2012 season before being released by mutual agreement on 3 December 2012. He subsequently entered the 2012 MLS Re-Entry Draft and became a free agent after going undrafted in both rounds of the draft.

On 21 February 2013 Aiyegbusi signed with First Division side FC Haka. After one season in Finland, Aiyegbusi signed for Swiss club Servette FC Genève on 3 January 2014.

On 10 August 2015, Aiyegbusi left VfB Auerbach after one season with the club to join  Superettan side AFC United.

Aiyegbusi joined Iranian side Siah Jamegan in November 2015.

In January 2017, Aiyegbusi went on trial with Kazakhstan Premier League side Shakhter Karagandy.

International
Aiyegbusi represented Great Britain in the 2009 World University Games in Belgrade, Serbia.

Personal
Aiyegbusi holds dual British and Nigerian citizenship. He is the fourth born of five siblings.

Career statistics

Club

References

External links
 
 NC State bio
 
 Korede Aiyegbusi Interview
 Korede Aiyegbusi: the English footballer who played in Iran

1988 births
Living people
Black British sportspeople
English footballers
NC State Wolfpack men's soccer players
Cary Clarets players
Sporting Kansas City players
FC Haka players
Servette FC players
AFC Eskilstuna players
North Carolina State University alumni
USL League Two players
Major League Soccer players
English people of Nigerian descent
English people of Yoruba descent
Expatriate soccer players in the United States
Expatriate footballers in Finland
Expatriate footballers in Germany
Expatriate footballers in Sweden
Expatriate footballers in Switzerland
Expatriate footballers in Iran
English expatriate sportspeople in Iran
English expatriate sportspeople in Finland
English expatriate sportspeople in Germany
English expatriate sportspeople in Sweden
English expatriate sportspeople in Switzerland
English expatriate sportspeople in the United States
Sporting Kansas City draft picks
Footballers from the London Borough of Hackney
Yoruba sportspeople
Association football defenders